The 2011 Michigan State Spartans football team competed on behalf of Michigan State University in the Legends Division of the Big Ten Conference during the 2011 NCAA Division I FBS football season. Head coach Mark Dantonio was in his fifth season with the Spartans. Michigan State played their home games at Spartan Stadium in East Lansing, Michigan. They finished the season 11–3, 7–1 in Big Ten play to be champions of the Legends Division. They represented the division in the inaugural Big Ten Championship Game where they lost to Leaders Division representative Wisconsin 39–42. They were invited to the Outback Bowl where they defeated Georgia 33–30 in three overtimes. Significantly, the Spartans were able to give 19 of their 20 true freshman redshirt years.

Previous season

Schedule

Game summaries

Youngstown State

Florida Atlantic

The Spartans earned their first shutout since 2008, which was also against FAU in a 17–0 win.

Notre Dame

Central Michigan

Ohio State

The Spartans were 16 seconds from their 2nd shutout of the year, but a touchdown pass put the Buckeyes on the board.  Michigan State recovered the onside kick securing the victory, their first against Ohio State in 7 meetings.

Michigan

    
    
    
    
    
    

Mark Dantonio and his Spartans earned their fourth straight victory over arch-rival Michigan. MSU's defense shut down quarterback Denard Robinson and sealed the victory on safety Isaiah Lewis' interception return for a touchdown. The Spartans wore unique Nike Pro Combat uniforms for the game.

Wisconsin

    
    
    
    
    
    
    
    
    
    
    

Michigan State found themselves down 14–0 early in the first quarter after two quick Wisconsin drives.  Momentum turned at the beginning of the second quarter, when Russell Wilson committed an intentional grounding penalty in the endzone, resulting in a safety and two points for the Spartans.  A subsequent touchdown made the score 14–9 UW.  On Wisconsin's next possession, they marched down to the Michigan State 13-yard line, but their field goal attempt was blocked. MSU recovered and drove down the field to make it 16–14 MSU.  With the second quarter clock running down, Wisconsin punted it away, but this too was blocked and recovered in the endzone for a Michigan State touchdown, making the halftime score 23–14 Spartans.
With 8:40 to play in the 4th quarter, the Badgers found themselves down 31–17. A quick score made it 31–24.  The teams traded possessions and Wisconsin got the ball back with 4:28 to play. The Badgers marched down the field once again and tied the game at 31–31 with 1:26 to play.
Michigan State started the next drive at their own 22.  After a first down QB Kirk Cousins was sacked for a ten-yard loss, and Wisconsin then called a timeout with 00:42 left.  Following a twelve-yard pass to make a 3rd and 8 situation, it appeared Michigan State was willing to let the clock run out and take the game into overtime.  However, Wisconsin called timeout again with 00:30 left.  The Spartans completed passes of 11 and 9 yards on their next two plays to get to the Wisconsin 44-yard line and then called timeout with 00:10 to go.  After an incomplete pass four seconds remained on the clock.
Michigan State lined up in a shotgun formation.  Kirk Cousins took the snap and rolled out to the right before launching a Hail Mary to the endzone.  Waiting there was BJ Cunningham, but he was screened by Wisconsin player Jared Abbrederis who had jumped too early to try to deflect the ball.  The ball made it to Cunningham but went off his facemask, bouncing into the hands of Keith Nichol who was at the one-yard line.  As Nichol fought to cross the goal line, he was met by two Badgers attempting to keep him out. After the whistles blew, the officials marked the ball at the one foot line, sending the game to overtime as the clock had run out. Then a call came down from the review booth to look at the play again on replay. After review, the officials found "The runner did cross the line", and Spartan Stadium erupted in celebration. 
In the post game interview on the field, Dantonio was asked what the play call was, replying with "It's a Rocket play. You know, throw it in the endzone, let it be tipped around and see who comes up with it." It was the third game in two years to be labeled by a play name, with Rocket joining the 2010 games of Little Giants (Notre Dame fake field goal) and Mousetrap (Northwestern fake punt).

Nebraska

Minnesota

Iowa

Source: 
    
    
    
    
    
    
    
    
    
    

The Spartans earned their first victory in Kinnick Stadium since 1989.

Indiana

    
    
    
    
    
    
    
    
    
    

Win clinched at least share of Legends Division. The title became outright later in the day when Michigan defeated Nebraska.

Northwestern

Michigan State secured sole possession of the Legends Division championship with the victory.

Wisconsin (Big Ten Championship Game)

Georgia (Outback Bowl)

Source: 
    
    
    
    
    
    
    
    
    
    
    
    

The Spartans played their first overtime game since Notre Dame in 2010, and their first triple overtime game since 2004.  Prior to overtime, the Spartans had a ten-play, 85-yard drive that tied the game at 27 with nineteen seconds left and sent the game into overtime. In the first overtime, Kirk Cousins threw an interception to end MSU's possession, but Georgia kicker Blair Walsh missed a 42-yard field goal to allow the game to continue into a second extra period. The teams traded field goals in the second overtime, and Michigan State opened the third overtime with a 28-yard field goal by Dan Conroy.  On the final play of the game, Walsh's 47-yard kick was blocked by Anthony Rashad White, giving the Spartans a 33–30 victory.  It was Coach Dantonio's first bowl victory with Michigan State, and Michigan State's first bowl victory since the 2001 Silicon Valley Bowl.

Roster

Rankings

References

Michigan State
Michigan State Spartans football seasons
ReliaQuest Bowl champion seasons
Michigan State Spartans football